Orban (died 1453) was an iron founder and engineer from the Kingdom of Hungary. 

Orban or Orbán may also refer to:

Viktor Orbán, Prime Minister of Hungary
Ludovic Orban, Romanian MP, former Prime Minister of Romania
Leonard Orban, former European Commissioner for Multilingualism
Orban (name)
Orban (audio processing), an international company making audio processors for Radio, TV and Internet broadcasters
Orban, Tarn, a commune in France
Pârâul lui Orban, tributary of the Romanian river Pădureni (Râul Negru)